Seltso is a rural locality (a village) in Vinogradovsky District, Arkhangelsk Oblast, Russia. The population was 32 as of 2010.

Geography 
Seltso is located on the Severnaya Dvina River, 84 km southeast of Bereznik (the district's administrative centre) by road. Kovernikovskaya is the nearest rural locality.

References 

Rural localities in Vinogradovsky District